John Archibald Phillips House is an historic home located at Poplar Bluff, Butler County, Missouri. It was built in 1891, and is a -story, irregular plan, Queen Anne style frame dwelling.  It has a gable roof with fishscale shingles on the gable end and features a one-story, shed roof entry porch with milled and chamfered columns. Surrounding the house is an original cast-iron fence. The house was acquired by the Butler County Historical Society in 1985 to serve as a house museum and meeting space.

It was listed on the National Register of Historic Places in 1998.

References

Historic house museums in Missouri
Houses on the National Register of Historic Places in Missouri
Queen Anne architecture in Missouri
Houses completed in 1891
Houses in Butler County, Missouri
National Register of Historic Places in Butler County, Missouri